A phlebolith is a small local, usually rounded, calcification within a vein. These are very common in the veins of the lower part of the pelvis, and they are generally of no clinical importance. When located in the pelvis they are sometimes difficult to differentiate from kidney stones in the ureters on X-ray.

Phleboliths in the pelvic region are present in about 44.2% of people and are more common in females (50.1%) than males (37.3%). The amount of phleboliths increases with age and they also appear more often on the left than on the right side of the pelvic region. Phleboliths outside the pelvic region appear in about 2% of the population.

Indications 
Phleboliths can be diagnostic for venous malformations.

References

Veins